

CFD may refer to:

Business and economics
 Carbon fee and dividend, an economic mechanism to lower and ultimately do away with, emissions of climate gases
 Centre for Finance and Development, an interdisciplinary research centre at the Graduate Institute of International and Development Studies
 Contract for difference, a type of financial derivative, where two parties exchange the difference between opening and closing value of an underlying asset
 Control-flow diagram, is a diagram to describe the control flow of a business process, process or program
 Cumulative Flow Diagram, an area graph that depicts the quantity of work in a given state

Entertainment
 Cheyenne Frontier Days, an annual rodeo and celebration held in Cheyenne, Wyoming
 Christie Front Drive, a second wave indie/emo band from Denver, Colorado

Firefighting services
 Calgary Fire Department, Alberta, Canada
 Charlotte Fire Department, North Carolina, U.S.
 Chicago Fire Department, Illinois, U.S.
 Cincinnati Fire Department, Ohio, U.S.
 Cleveland Fire Department, Ohio, U.S.
 Columbus Fire Department, Ohio, U.S.

Science and technology
 CFEngine daemon, the process that runs CFEngine
 Common fill device, an electronic module used to load cryptographic keys into electronic encryption  machines 
 Complement factor D, an enzyme encoded by the CFD gene
 Computational fluid dynamics, a branch of fluid mechanics using computational methods to predict the behavior of fluid flows
 Congenital Femoral Deficiency, a rare birth defect that affects the pelvis and the proximal femur
 Constant fraction discriminator, a signal processing component
 Counterfactual definiteness, the ability, in quantum mechanics, to consider results of unperformed measurements

Transport
 Coulter Field (IATA: CFD), an airport in Bryan, Texas
 Compagnie des chemins de fer départementaux, French rail vehicle manufacturer producing narrow gauge rail vehicles, see Captrain France

See also
Cfds (disambiguation)